Pedreira Esporte Clube, commonly referred to as Pedreira, is a Brazilian professional club based in Mosqueiro, administrative district of the city of Belém, Pará founded on 7 September 1925.

Honours
 Campeonato Paraense Second Division
 Winners (2): 1994, 2000

External links
 Official page on Facebook
 Pedreira on Globo Esporte

Association football clubs established in 1925
Belém
1925 establishments in Brazil